Robert Schable (August 31, 1873 – July 7, 1947) was an American stage and screen actor as well as a stage manager from Hamilton, Ohio.

Biography
A longtime stage player from the Charles Frohman company since the 1890s, Schable began in silent films in 1919. In films he often played comedic, character parts or men with a European flair. He died, from Ptomaine poisoning, in Hollywood in 1947. Alternately IMDb has his death as a suicide.

Two films Schable appeared in have been restored, Sherlock Holmes (1922) and The Man and the Moment (1929).

Broadway shows in which Schable appeared included On With the Dance (1917), The Fallen Idol (1915), Inconstant George (1909), Jack Straw (1908), De Lancey (1905), The Duke of Killicrankie (1904), Captain Dieppe (1903), The Mummy and the Humming Bird (1903), The Mummy and the Humming Bird (1902), The Second in Command (1901), Richard Carvel (1900), Beau Brummell (1899), Cyrano de Bergerac (1899), and The Man of Destiny (1899).

Selected filmography

The World to Live In (1919)
The Marriage Price (1919)
 Redhead  (1919)   
The Test of Honor (1919)
The Firing Line (1919)
On with the Dance (1920)
Sinners (1920)
The Stolen Kiss (1920)
A Romantic Adventuress (1920)
Blind Wives (1920)
Paying the Piper (1921)
Without Limit (1921)
Experience (1921)
 Sisters (1922)
Sherlock Holmes (1922)
 The Woman Who Fooled Herself (1922)
 Love's Masquerade (1922)
Bella Donna (1923)
Slander the Woman (1923)
 In Search of a Thrill (1923)
The Silent Partner (1923)
The Cheat (1923)
The Stranger (1924)
Partners Again (1926)
Silken Shackles (1926)
The Love of Sunya (1927)
Sailors' Wives (1928)
Careers (1929)
The Man and the Moment (1929)
The Locked Door (1929) (uncredited)

References

External links

kinotv.com

1873 births
1947 deaths
Male actors from Ohio
American stage actors
Deaths from food poisoning